The Athletics at the 2016 Summer Paralympics – Women's 200 metres T35 event at the 2016 Paralympic Games took place on 17 September 2016, at the Estádio Olímpico João Havelange.

Final 
11:13 17 September 2016:

Notes

Athletics at the 2016 Summer Paralympics